Electric light is an artificial light source powered by electricity.

Electric Light may also refer to:
 Light fixture, a decorative enclosure for an electric light source
 Electric Light (album), a 2018 album by James Bay
 Electric Light (poetry), a poetry collection by Irish poet Seamus Heaney, 2001
 "Electric Light" (song), a 2008 song by Infernal